Serpanki is a rural locality (a khutor) in Grishevskoye Rural Settlement, Podgorensky District, Voronezh Oblast, Russia. The population was 105 as of 2010. There are 2 streets.

Geography 
Serpanki is located 15 km northwest of Podgorensky (the district's administrative centre) by road. Peschany is the nearest rural locality.

References 

Rural localities in Podgorensky District